James Ohrenschall (born in October 1972 in Las Vegas, Nevada) is an American politician and a Democratic member of the Nevada Senate since November 7, 2018 representing District 21, succeeding Mark Manendo. He previously served in the Nevada Assembly from 2006-2018 representing District 12; he succeeded his mother, Eugenia 'Genie' Ohrenschall, who held the seat from 1994 until 2006.

Education
Ohrenschall attended the College of Southern Nevada, earned his BA from the University of Nevada, Las Vegas, and his JD from its William S. Boyd School of Law.

Elections

2006—When Democratic Assemblywoman Genie Ohrenschall retired and left the District 12 seat open, Ohrenschall won the August 15, 2006 Democratic Primary with 1,831 votes (75.01%), and won the November 7, 2006 General election with 5,314 votes (70.55%) against Republican nominee Lee Haynes, who had run for an Assembly seat in 2004.
2008—Ohrenschall won the August 12, 2008 Democratic Primary with 1,060 votes (78.58%), and won the November 4, 2008 General election with 9,680 votes (74.59%) against Republican nominee Dallas Augustine.
2010—Ohrenschall was unopposed for the June 8, 2010 Democratic Primary and won the November 2, 2010 General election with 6,843 votes (73.02%) against Republican nominee Tod Oppenborn.
2012—Ohrenschall won the June 12, 2012 Democratic Primary with 1,229 votes (76.96%), and won the November 6, 2012 General election with 13,274 votes (59.52%) against Republican nominee Bridgette Bryant.
2014—Ohrenschall won re-election.
2016 - Ohrenschall won the November 8, 2016 General election with 13,942 votes (54.9%) against Republican nominee Mark Riggins and Libertarian nominee Troy Warren.

References

External links
 Profile at the Nevada Senate
 Campaign website
 

Date of birth missing (living people)
1972 births
Living people
College of Southern Nevada alumni
Democratic Party members of the Nevada Assembly
Nevada lawyers
Democratic Party Nevada state senators
People from the Las Vegas Valley
University of Nevada, Las Vegas alumni
William S. Boyd School of Law alumni
21st-century American politicians